A mediterranean sea is, in oceanography, a mostly enclosed sea that has limited exchange of water with outer oceans and with water circulation dominated by salinity and temperature differences rather than winds or tides. The eponymous Mediterranean Sea, for example, is almost completely enclosed by Europe, Asia, and Africa.

List of mediterranean seas

The Mediterranean seas of the Atlantic Ocean

 The namesake Mediterranean Seas, including the Black Sea, the Sea of Azov, the Aegean Sea (including the so called Thracian Sea and  Sea of Crete), the Adriatic Sea, the Alboran Sea, the Ligurian Sea, the Balearic Sea, the Tyrrhenian Sea, the Ionian Sea, and the Sea of Marmara.
 The Arctic Ocean (or Arctic Mediterranean Sea, which many regard as an ocean)
 The American Mediterranean Sea: the combination of the Gulf of Mexico and the Caribbean Sea.
 The Baltic Sea
 Baffin Bay

The Mediterranean seas of the Indian Ocean

 The Persian Gulf
 The Red Sea
 The Australasian Mediterranean Sea (including the  Banda,  Sulu,  Sulawesi and Java Seas)

Types of Mediterranean seas
There are two types of Mediterranean sea.

Concentration basin

A concentration basin has a higher salinity than the outer ocean due to evaporation, and its water exchange consists of inflow  of the fresher oceanic water in the upper layer and outflow of the saltier Mediterranean water in the lower layer of the connecting channel.
The Red Sea
The Persian Gulf
The Eurafrican Mediterranean Sea is also a concentration basin as a whole, but the Black Sea and the Adriatic Sea are dilution basins (see below) owing to the Danube, Don, and Dnieper Rivers and the Po River respectively.

Dilution basin

A dilution basin has a lower salinity due to freshwater gains such as rainfall and rivers, and its water exchange consists of outflow of the fresher Mediterranean water in the upper layer and inflow of the saltier oceanic water in the lower layer of the channel.  Renewal of deep water may not be sufficient to supply oxygen to the bottom.
The Arctic Ocean
The American Mediterranean Sea
The Baltic Sea
Baffin Bay
The Black Sea
The Australasian Mediterranean Sea

Exceptions
The Hudson Bay is so shallow it functions like a huge estuary.
Having shallow channels and deep basins, the Sea of Japan could form a Mediterranean sea, but the strong currents from the Pacific prevent it from having an independent water circulation.
The Baltic Sea is a brackish inland sea, alleged to be the largest body of brackish water in the world (other possibilities include the Black Sea). It occupies a basin formed by glacial erosion.

See also

 Inland sea (geology)
 Marginal sea

References

Arctic Ocean
 
Oceanographical terminology